Rent Romus (born 1968) is an American saxophonist and multi-instrumentalist, bandleader, music and performing arts producer, and community leader living in the San Francisco Bay area.

Biography

Beginnings
Romus was born in Hancock, Michigan. He began playing piano at the age of five until he was thirteen when he decided to play the alto saxophone, which his mother also played.  In 1982 and 1984, Romus attended the Stanford Jazz Workshop summer programs where he participated in master classes led by Stan Getz, Bruce Forman, Eddie Moore, and Dizzy Gillespie. Romus's exposure to Stan Getz was a pivotal moment in his early development where Getz would ask him to find a mirror and work on his tone watching his embouchure as he played.  His pivotal experience with the tenor saxophonist was when Getz picked up his horn and joined him in a rendition of the song "I’ll Remember April" during a master class.
When Romus was  sixteen years of age, his first experience in curation was hoisted upon him after his high school teacher Dick Goodrich quit his job leaving him in charge of a 17-piece big band called the North Area Youth Jazz Ensemble (NAYJE).  From 1987 - 1991 he attended the University of California at Santa Cruz.  While at college he led the band Jazz on the Line which he had founded alongside saxophonist/composer Michael Sidney Timpson in 1984, that served as a vehicle for the members' compositions and performances.

Nineties
Between 1989 and 1994 Romus produced three albums with Jazz on the Line including In the Moment with tenor saxophonist  Chico Freeman.  Other performing members during the group's history included saxophonist Dan Magay, pianist Stephano DeZerega, trumpeter Jason Olaine, vocalist Anna Gurski, and drummer Ben Leinbach.  Other guest artists included drummer Steve Rossi, bassists Ravi Abcarian, Corin Stiggall, and Ernie Provenchure.
After graduating from the University of California in Santa Cruz in 1992, Romus worked odd jobs before moving to San Francisco in 1993 where he formed a trio with drummer James Zitro and former Sun Ra Arkestra cellist Kash Killion, originally called the RKZtet and later dubbed the Lords of Outland.
In 1995 Romus changed personnel of the group to include his longtime associate Jason Olaine along with drummer Andrew Borger and bassist Vytas Nagisetty (aka Brock Lee). That same year he recorded the first Lords of Outland album entitled You'll Never Be the Same. In the summer of 1995 and 1996 Romus toured in Denmark with pianist Jonas Müller, drummer Tomas Barfod, drummer Stefan Pasborg which later led to his 1999 recording with Pasborg and bassist Jonas Westergaard as the Life's Blood Trio.  In 1997 Romus performed and recorded with Jon Birdsong, Dave Mihaly, and guest tenor saxophonist John Tchicai known best for his work with John Coltrane and Albert Ayler in the 1960s. In 1998 Romus worked with instrument inventor Tom Nunn, cellist Doug Carroll, guitarist Joel Harrison and drummer Dave Mihaly.  This formation focused on a set of compositions inspired by the writings of author Philip K. Dick.

New millennium
In 2001 Romus reinvented the Lords of Outland with bassist Bill Noertker, drummer Dave Mihaly and the late trombonist Toyoji Tomita, and later that year recorded Avatar In the Field a tribute to the late saxophonist Albert Ayler .  In 2002 Romus began working with poet/musician/artist CJ Borosque whom he later married. Together they produced The Metal Quan Yin (destinations suite) with an expanded group that included vocalist Jesse Quattro and Andre Custodio, based on her self-published book of the same name. That same year also marked a shift in Romus’ musical exploration branching out into complete free improvisation when he alongside guitarist Ernesto Diaz-Infante created The Abstractions, a collective ensemble that ranged in size from two to ten players. The group toured the west coast of the United States in 2002 and 2004 and released three recordings and included Jesse Quattro, Scott R Looney, Bob Marsh, Philip Everett, Sandor Finta, CJ Borosque, Ray Schaeffer, Lance Grabmiller, Alwyn Quebido, and Dina Emerson.
In 2006 Romus toured through the midwest of the United States performing in St. Louis Missouri, Urbana Illinois, Detroit Michigan, and Columbus Ohio with stops along the east coast to Philadelphia and New York City with composer and pianist Thollem McDonas and drummer Jon Brumit as the Bloom Project. In contrast to the Lords of Outland, Bloom Project featured a more sparse melodic repertoire.  During that same year Romus shifted the roster of the current Lords of Outland with drummer Philip Everett, bassist Ray Schaeffer, and CJ Borosque on no-input effects pedals mixing harsh noise and free improvisation and producing recordings to present day.

Curator, producer
From his first experience as a young music producer in 1984 with the North Area Youth Jazz Ensemble (NAYJE), Romus continued to produce and curate performances and presentations in the San Francisco Bay Area.   Romus runs Edgetone Records, launched in 1991 originally as a vanity label to support his recordings, and later in 2001 began releasing other artists primarily from the San Francisco Bay Area crossing many forms of improvised and experimental music. He was the executive director of Jazz in Flight from 1996 to 1997 a non-profit jazz presenting organization based in Oakland California until it disbanded in 2001, which booked creative touring and local performing musicians at Yoshi's (jazz club) in Oakland California. He founded Outsound Presents, a non-profit artist-based organization and serves as the executive director while curating The SIMM Music Series at the Musicians Union Hall as well as the Luggage Store Gallery New Music Series in San Francisco. Romus co-founded and was the Director of Promotion for the SFAlt Festival in 2002-04 which led him to create and organize the annual Edgetone New Music Summit, a national experimental music festival held in the greater San Francisco Bay Area. The festival is now produced under the Outsound Presents banner which continues at the present under the title, Outsound New Music Summit.

Discography

As leader or co-leader
Jazz on the Line, Dark Wind, 1988
Jazz on the Line, no boundaries, 1991
Jazz on the Line with Chico Freeman, In The Moment, 1994
You'll Never Be The Same, Lords of Outland, 1995
Adapt...or DIE!, Lords of Outland with John Tchicai, 1997
Blood Motions, Life's Blood Trio, 1999
Avatar In the Field – A Tribute to Albert Ayler, Lords of Outland,  2001
Out of Town - Guinea Pig, 2001
PKD Vortex Project, Lords of Outland, inspired by the Stories of Phil K. Dick, 2001
The Metal Quan Yin, Lords of Outland with poet CJ Borosque, 2002
Sonic Conspiracy, The Abstractions, 2002
ARS VIVENDE, The Abstractions, 2003
Novo Navigatio, The Abstractions, 2004
The Foolkiller, Tri-Cornered Tent Show, 2005
Reverberations of Spring Past, 2006
Culture of Pain, Lords of Outland, 2006
Bloom, Bloom Project with Thollem Mcdonas, Jon Brumit, and Steven Baker, 2006
You can sleep when you're dead!, Lords of Outland, 2008
Prismatic Season, Bloom Project, 2008
Thundershine, Jazz On The Line with Chico Freeman (re-issue of In The Moment), 2008
GRID, Ministry of Rites, 2008
Sudden Aurora, Bloom Project with Thollem Mcdonas, 2009
XV (the first fifteen years 1994–2009), Lords of Outland, 2009
Emergency Rental, The Emergency String (X)tet meet Rent Romus, 2010
Edge of Dark, Lords of Outland with Vinny Golia, 2011
Cloudknitter Suite, Lords of Outland 2012
Thee Unhip, Lords of Outland 2012
Truth Teller, Life's Blood Ensemble 2013
The Proceedings of Dr. Ké, Lords of Outland 2014
Cimmerian Crossroads, Life's Blood Ensemble 2014
Lords O Leaping, Lords of Outland 2014
The Otherworld Cycle, Life's Blood Ensemble 2015
LiR, Rent Romus with Teddy Rankin-Parker and Daniel Pearce 2016
Rising Colossus, Life's Blood Ensemble 2016
Deciduous, Midwestern Edition Vol. 1 2017
In the darkness we speak a sound brightness and life, Lords of Outland 2017
The Expedition, Rent Romus with Rob Pumpelly and Eli Wallace 2017
Rogue Star, Life's Blood Ensemble 2018
Live at Malmitalo, Otherworld Ensemble 2018
Northern Fire, Otherworld Ensemble 2018
side three New Work, Life's Blood Ensemble 2019
25 years under the mountain, Lords of Outland 2019
The New Neighbors, Guinea Pig 2020
Manala, Rent Romus Heikki Koskinen and Life's Blood Ensemble 2020
Return from Manala, Otherworld Ensemble 2020
we are sparks in the universe to our own fire, ruth weiss 2021
Baptismal, Actual/Actual 2022

As a sideman
Paris Slim with Joe Lewis Walker, Sonny Rhodes, Bleedin’ Heart, 1996
Jim Ryan's Forward Energy Configurations, 2002
Moe!kestra!, Two Forms of Multitudes, 2003
Tri-Cornered Tent Show, Legion of Dagon, 2004
C.O.M.A. California Outside Music Associates, 2004
Reverberations from Spring Past, 2005
Tri-Cornered Tent Show, The Foolkiller, 2006
Jim Ryan's Forward Energy, The Awakening, 2012
T.D. Skatchit & Company, Ear of the Storm, 2013
Heikki Koskinen, Sisällä/Ulkona (Inside/Outside), 2016
ruth weiss, Jazz & Haiku, 2018
Trouble Ensemble, In the Water, 2018
Zell Morris Trio, The one time we met, 2022

Filmography
Ruth Weiss: the Beat Goddess (Documentary) 2019
One More Step West is the Sea: Ruth Weiss (Documentary) 2021

Notes

External links

Edgetone Records
Outsound Presents
IMDB

1968 births
Living people
American jazz saxophonists
American male saxophonists
Avant-garde jazz saxophonists
Free jazz saxophonists
21st-century American saxophonists
21st-century American male musicians
American male jazz musicians